Karpen is a village in Albania. Karpen may also refer to:

People with the surname 
Henry C. Karpen (1868–1936), American politician
Judy Karpen (born 1953), American astrophysicist
Nicolae Vasilescu-Karpen (1870–1964), Romanian engineer and physicist
Richard Karpen (born 1957), American electronic music composer

Other 
Anton and Mary Agnes Karpen House, a historic building in South Dakota
Karpen House, a historic building in New York
S. Karpen & Bros., American furniture manufacturer